Oligia bridghamii, or Bridgham's brocade, is a species of cutworm or dart moth in the family Noctuidae. It was described by Augustus Radcliffe Grote and Coleman Townsend Robinson and is found in North America.

The MONA or Hodges number for Oligia bridghamii is 9415.

References

 Lafontaine, J. Donald & Schmidt, B. Christian (2010). "Annotated check list of the Noctuoidea (Insecta, Lepidoptera) of North America north of Mexico". ZooKeys, vol. 40, 1-239.

Further reading

 Arnett, Ross H. (2000). American Insects: A Handbook of the Insects of America North of Mexico. CRC Press.

External links

 Butterflies and Moths of North America

Oligia